Dylan River is an Australian film director, writer, and cinematographer.

Early life and family
River was born in Alice Springs, Northern Territory. His father, Warwick Thornton, is a filmmaker and his mother, Penelope McDonald, is a producer. He is the grandson of Freda Glynn, the co-founder of CAAMA.

Career
River's work includes writing, direction and cinematography.

In 2013, his debut feature documentary, Buckskin, won the Foxtel Australian Documentary Prize. 

He directed the 2022 six-part prequel series Mystery Road: Origin, and co-wrote several episodes.

Filmography

Awards and nominations

ARIA Music Awards
The ARIA Music Awards is an annual awards ceremony that recognises excellence, innovation, and achievement across all genres of Australian music. They commenced in 1987. 

! 
|-
| 2019
| Dylan River for Briggs (featuring Greg Holden) - "Life Is Incredible"
| Best Video
| 
|  
|-

References

Further reading

 Book review and extract.

External links
 

Living people
Australian film directors
Australian cinematographers
Year of birth missing (living people)